Esmaili Sofla (also Romanized as Esmā‘īlī Soflá and Esmā‘īlī-ye Soflá; also known as Esmā‘īlī, Esmā‘īlī Pā’īn, Esmā‘īlīyeh-ye Soflá, and Esmā‘īlī-ye Pā’īn) is a village in Esmaili Rural District, Esmaili District, Anbarabad County, Kerman Province, Iran. As of the 2006 census, its population was 1,601 within 349 families.

References 

Populated places in Anbarabad County